Malargüe is a  department located in the south west of Mendoza Province in Argentina. Its borders are San Rafael in the north, La Pampa Province in the east, Neuquén Province in the south and Chile to the west.

Geography
The south of the Malargüe Department is considered as the north tip of the Patagonia and is home to the many nature reserves such as La Payunia, Castillos de Pincheira, Caverna de las Brujas and Laguna de Llancanelo.

Districts
The department is divided in four districts:

Agua Escondida
Malargüe
Río Barrancas
Río Grande

Hydrology
Malargüe has many hydric resources. Among its most important rivers are the Grande River, the Colorado River, the Barrancas River and the Malargüe River, and the lagoons of Llancanelo, Negra and Niña Encantada.

Science
Malargüe is home to the Pierre Auger Observatory, an observatory designed to detect ultra-high-energy cosmic rays.

Tourism
The department has many exciting natural landmarks and is well suited for adventure tourism such as mountaineering, paragliding, rafting and kayaking. Here are located such exciting landmarks as Castillos de Pincheira, Tigre Cave, Brujas Cave and Pozo de las Ánimas - two closely located, up to 101 m deep sinkholes, where the wind often creates a howling sound.

Malargüe Department is home to the famous skiing resort of Las Leñas.

Gallery

References

External links

Municipal Website (Spanish)
Las Leñas Official Website (English)

1850 establishments in Argentina
Departments of Mendoza Province